The Northwestern State Demons basketball team is the men's basketball team that represents Northwestern State University in Natchitoches, Louisiana, United States. The team currently competes in the Southland Conference and The Demons have appeared in the NCAA tournament three times, most recently in 2013.

History

Mike McConathy era (1999–2022)
Mike McConathy was hired in 1999. In his first season, the team went 17–13 and finished fourth in the Southland Conference.

In 2001, McConathy led the Demons to their first ever NCAA tournament appearance. The Demons won the first play in game after the NCAA expanded the men's tournament from 64 to 65 teams. The Demons defeated Winthrop in that game, before losing to Illinois in the next round.

In 2005, the Demons finished the season 21–12, 13–3 to win the Southland Conference regular season championship. However, the Demons 10-game winning streak was stopped by Southeastern Louisiana in the Southland tournament championship.

The Demons would repeat as Southland regular season champions the following year. This time, they defeated Sam Houston State in the Southland tournament championship to earn their second appearance in the NCAA tournament. In the NCAA tournament as a No. 14 seed, the Demons earned one of the biggest upsets in the tournament by beating No. 15-ranked Iowa 64–63 in the first round. Jermaine Wallace hit a three-pointer with less than a second left in the game to give the Demons the victory, their second in NCAA history. The Demons advanced to the second round where they lost to West Virginia 67–54.

After some disappointing seasons where they only finished above .500 twice, the Demons returned to prominence in the 2012–13 season when they went 23–9, 15–3 in Southland play to finish in second place. The Demons defeated Stephen F. Austin to win the Southland tournament championship and earn their third trip to the NCAA tournament. However, they lost to Florida in the second round (formerly and now known as the first round).

Postseason appearances

NCAA tournament
The Demons have appeared in the NCAA tournament three times. Their combined record is 2–3.

CIT results
The Demons have appeared in the CollegeInsider.com Postseason Tournament (CIT) one time. Their record is 0–1.

NAIA tournament
The Demons have appeared in one NAIA tournament. Their record is 1–1.

See also
List of NCAA Division I men's basketball programs

References

External links